The 1952 Cork Senior Hurling Championship was the 63rd staging of the Cork Senior Hurling Championship since its establishment by the Cork County Board in 1887. The draw for the opening round fixtures took place at the Cork Convention on 20 January 1952. The championship began on 27 April 1952 and ended on 5 October 1952.

Sarsfields were the defending champions, however, they were defeated by Avondhu in the first round.

On 5 October 1952, Avondhu won the championship following a 3-08 to 4-04 defeat of St. Finbarr's in a replay of the final. This was their first championship title ever.

Team changes

To Championship

Promoted from the Cork Intermediate Hurling Championship
 Ballincollig
 Midleton
 Shanballymore

From Championship

Declined to field a team
 Seandún

Results

First round

Second round

Semi-finals

Finals

Championship statistics

Miscellaneous

 Avondhu became the first divisional team to win the county championship.
 For the first time ever the titles fails to go to a city club for a second season in a row.

References

Cork Senior Hurling Championship
Cork Senior Hurling Championship